Moon Over Manifest is a 2010 children's novel written by American  Clare Vanderpool. The book was awarded the 2011 Newbery Medal for excellence in children's literature, the Spur Award for best Western juvenile fiction, and was named a Kansas Notable Book.  The story follows a young and adventurous girl named Abilene who is sent to Manifest, Kansas by her father in the summer of 1936.  The author's note at the end of the book states the fictional town of Manifest, Kansas, is based on the real town of Frontenac, Kansas.

Plot summary

The main character is Abilene Tucker, an adventurous twelve year old girl from 1936. Her father, Gideon, sent her to the small town of Manifest, Kansas, where he grew up, while he worked a railroad job somewhere else. He left her with his broken compass, which was engraved "St. Dizier, October 8, 1918". Abilene arrived in Manifest to find that it was run-down and greatly affected by the Great Depression. A pastor took her in, and in that house, she discovered a box of mementos and letters from a boy named Ned addressed to a boy named Jinx stashed away under a floorboard. One letter mentioned the "Rattler." Abilene and her two friends, Lettie and Ruthanne, believed the Rattler had been a German spy in 1918. After some investigating, they received a note telling them to "leave well enough alone." 

Realizing that she had lost her father's compass while searching for the spy, Abilene walked down the "Path to Perdition", a house where Miss Sadie, a diviner, lived, to search for it. On the way, Abilene accidentally broke a diviner's pot. To pay off her debt and earn her compass back from the diviner, Abilene did odd jobs for her: she tilled dry soil during a drought, planted seeds in it, and hunted for strange plants, all of which seemed to have no useful purpose.

Sensing that Abilene was feeling abandoned by her father, the diviner told her a story of the past about two boys in Manifest in 1918 called Jinx and Ned. Jinx was a twelve-year-old con artist who left his partner after thinking he accidentally killed a man, and Ned, the writer of the letters, was a fifteen-year-old adopted boy who used Jinx's skills to sign up for the army underage. He left Jinx his compass when he went off to war and wrote him letters from the battlefield. At the time, Manifest was controlled by the owners of the mine because there were no jobs or money without them during the war; the owners paid the poor workers very little and forced them to work more shifts, or else they'd be fired.

After a land-owning widow died, the mine owners desired that piece of land for their own profit. However, the town had first pick, and they needed to raise $1,000 for it before the deadline. They didn't want the mine owners to know about it, or else they'd give them more work and also stop them from raising the money, so everyone feigned illness and put the town under quarantine to get rid of the mine owners. They sold a healing elixir and raised most of the money, but someone revealed their plans to the mine owners, causing them to return and put everyone back to work.

A government official, the nephew of a resident of Manifest, tricked one of the mine owners into buying part of the land up for sale because of the "healing spring" he could use to make a fortune. However, it was regular water, and the tax he paid for the land went to the town, giving them enough money to buy the rest of the land. Soon afterwards, the fooled man sold his part of the land for a fraction of the cost he paid for it. Meanwhile, Jinx confronted his old partner in crime, and discovered that the partner was the one who killed the man, not Jinx. The old partner dies when trying to pursue Jinx. The town celebrated their triumph over the mine owners, only to be crushed by news of the death of the well-known Ned in St-Dzier, France, on October 8, 1918. Jinx thought it was his fault Ned was killed by the Germans. He left Manifest for good. Soon after, Spanish influenza killed many people in Manifest and the town became the run-down, battered outpost Abilene knew.

Abilene heard the story and matched the letters and mementos she had to the story the diviner told her. She put the pieces together and discovered that Jinx was her father; when she got a cut and became very ill, her father began acting differently around her because he thought it was his fault, which it wasn't. That was the reason he left her in Manifest. Furthermore, Ned was the son of the diviner, who had been keeping watch on her son from afar. After sending a telegram to her father, feigning ill herself, she discovered that the Rattler was a story someone made up after seeing a nun and her rattling rosary in the woods at night. The "spy" they happened to find was the undertaker, the person who had revealed the town's trick to the mine owners almost twenty years ago. He was afraid that the kids had found out about that, so he sent them the note to scare them. Abilene's father returned to Manifest and found that his daughter wasn't ill, and after she told him about knowing about his past, he understood her when she asked him to stay. They went into Manifest together to rebuild their lives.

Characters

Main characters

Abilene Tucker, a brave 12-year-old girl stuck in a small town after a life on the road begins to learn about the town's history and how it ties in with her own. She is a very confident young girl.
Miss Sadie Redizon, a mysterious Hungarian fortune teller who only tells stories about the past.
Jinx (Gideon Tucker), a boy that comes to Manifest and changes it
Soletta (Lettie) Taylor, Abilene's friend who is helping find the Rattler and Ruthanne's cousin
Benedek (Ned) Gillian, son of Miss Sadie and friend of Jinx

Minor Characters

Gideon Tucker, Abilene's father who sends her to stay with a friend in the town
Hattie Mae Harper, the town's newspaper reporter who helps Abilene research her family's past.
Sister Redempta, the town's school teacher nun, also helps with other affairs.  
Mr. Underhill, an undertaker

Reception
Moon Over Manifest has been received favorably.  Kirkus Reviews described it as "richly detailed, splendidly written", while Publishers Weekly saw a "memorable coming-of-age story" and "Replete with historical details and surprises, Vanderpool's debut delights, while giving insight into family and community." Common Sense Media called it "a nostalgic, robust story". Booklist found it "like sucking on a butterscotch. Smooth and sweet." School Library Journal said that "thoroughly enjoyable, unique page-turner [Moon Over Manifest] is a definite winner."

References

External links

Google Books preview of Moon Over Manifest
TeachingBooks.net audio of the author sharing some of the inspiration for the book
Text complexity analysis by the Wisconsin Department of Public Instruction
5 Questions with...Clare Vanderpool on Moon Over Manifest and her new book, Navigating Early

2010 American novels
Newbery Medal–winning works
American children's novels
Children's historical novels
Novels set in Kansas
Fiction set in 1936
2010 children's books
Delacorte Press books